Xu Jianyi (born December 1953 in Fushan District, Yantai, Shandong) is a former Chinese politician and entrepreneur. He was the Chairman of FAW Group, the delegate of the 17th and 18th National Congress of the Chinese Communist Party, the member of the 11th and 12th National People's Congress. On March 15, 2015, Xu Jianyi was placed under investigation by the Communist Party's anti-corruption agency. In 2017, Xu was sentenced to 11 years in prison for bribery.

Career
Xu Jianyi was born in Fushan District, Yantai, Shandong, traces his ancestry to Nanjing. He went to work in April 1970 and joined Chinese Communist Party in June 1986. In 1975 Xu went to FAW Group. In 1990–1994, Xu Jianyi went to Changchun Automobile Research Institute. In December 2004, Xu became the mayor of Jilin City, and he became the Communist Party Secretary of Jilin City in September 2006. In December 2007, he became the President of FAW Group, a Chinese state-owned automotive manufacturing company. Xu Jianyi became the Chairman of FAW Group in December 2010.

Downfall
On March 15, 2015, Xu Jianyi was placed under investigation by the Central Commission for Discipline Inspection, the party's internal disciplinary body, for "serious violations of laws and regulations". Before the investigation, FAW Group officers are investigated by the local commission for Discipline Inspection of the Chinese Communist Party.

On August 13, 2015, the CCDI announced his expulsion from the Chinese Communist Party. In the announcement, the anti-graft body cited a litany of abuses, including "not carrying out decisions made by the [party] organisation," working to seek promotion for his son, accepting cash gifts, purchased real estate which "contravened the interests of the state", illegally procured bonuses, took bribes to seek gain for others in the promotion of subordinates and operations of businesses, and obstructed and interfered with the investigation into his wrongdoing. He was indicted on bribery charges, though the announcements did not say that his bribes were "massive" in scale, unlike most other announcements of this type.

On February 9, 2017, Xu was sentenced on 11 years and 6 months in prison for taking bribes worth 12.18 million yuan (~$1.77 million) by the First Intermediate People's Court in Beijing.

References

External links
 "共和国长子"的心声 中国经济网独家专访徐建一 (Xu Jianyi's interview)

1953 births
Living people
Politicians from Yantai
Political office-holders in Jilin
Chinese Communist Party politicians from Shandong
People's Republic of China politicians from Shandong
FAW Group people
Jilin University alumni
Businesspeople from Yantai
Chinese chief executives in the automobile industry
Expelled members of the Chinese Communist Party
Chinese politicians convicted of corruption
Automotive businesspeople